Terry Duane Irving (born July 3, 1971) is a former professional American football player who played linebacker for five seasons for the Arizona Cardinals.

References

1971 births
Living people
Sportspeople from Galveston, Texas
Players of American football from Texas
American football linebackers
McNeese Cowboys football players
Arizona Cardinals players